Round Rock High School is a public high school located in Round Rock, Texas, a suburb of North Austin. Founded in 1867, it is the oldest high school in the Round Rock Independent School District. As of 2021, it is the largest high school in the Greater Austin area by student enrollment.

Round Rock High School is designated by the UIL as a 6A school.

Extracurricular activities
Round Rock received national attention for its 1994-95 yearbook, believed to be the first ever released in CD-ROM format. The yearbook contained 2,000 photographs, 25 minutes of video and 20 minutes of audio material.

In 1996–97, the baseball team won the 5A state championship, defeating Lubbock Monterey by a score of 7–1 in the tournament final.

The Computer Science team won the 5A State Championship in 1998.

The Round Rock Dragon Band is a musical ensemble made up of wind and percussion instruments. The Dragon Band marched in the 2015 Rose parade. The band has also attended 5 BOA Grand Nationals marching competitions:

 2013, 4th Place Finalists, Outstanding Music in Semifinals. Score of 93.95
 2015, 7th Place Finalists. Score of 93.0
 2017, 12th Place Finalists. Score of 89.625
 2019, 9th Place Finalists. Score of 90.425
 2021, 16th Place Semi-Finalists. Score of 88.450

Notable alumni

Jeffrey S. Boyd, associate justice of the Texas Supreme Court
John Danks, Major League Baseball (MLB) starting pitcher
Ryan Langerhans, Major League Baseball (MLB) outfielder
Brian Gordon, Major League Baseball (MLB) outfielder and starting pitcher
Jordan Danks, Major League Baseball (MLB) outfielder 
John Henson (basketball), National Basketball Association (NBA) center
James Lynch, National Football League (NFL) defensive tackle
Mason Thompson, Major League Baseball (MLB) relief pitcher

References

External links 
 Round Rock HS Web Site
 District Homepage

Round Rock Independent School District
Educational institutions established in 1913
High schools in Williamson County, Texas
Public high schools in Texas
1913 establishments in Texas